Oxford German Studies is a quarterly peer-reviewed academic journal covering German studies. It was established in 1965 and was published by Maney Publishing (formerly the Modern Humanities Research Association), until its takeover by Taylor & Francis, where it is now published under their imprint Routledge. It was established, among others, by Peter Ganz (St Edmund Hall, Oxford). The editors-in-chief are Jim Reed and Nigel Palmer; since 2017 Henrike Lähnemann has joined the board for medieval German studies.

Abstracting and indexing
The journal is abstracted and indexed in:

References

External links

Publications associated with the University of Oxford
Quarterly journals
Publications established in 1965
Multilingual journals
English-language journals
German-language journals
Area studies journals
German studies
Routledge academic journals